Gene Newman is an American politician from the Republican Party. He is a member of the Mississippi House of Representatives from the 61st District.

References 

Year of birth missing (living people)
Living people
Republican Party members of the Mississippi House of Representatives
21st-century American politicians
Place of birth missing (living people)